Lobotorna is a monotypic moth genus of the family Erebidae. Its only species, Lobotorna albapex, is found in Panama. Both the genus and species were first described by George Hampson in 1924.

References

Herminiinae
Monotypic moth genera